The Ruth Moore Act of 2013 is a bill that was introduced into the 113th United States Congress and passed the United States House of Representatives on June 4, 2013.  The bill would change some of the rules regarding mental health medical coverage for veterans to treat claims related to military sexual trauma more leniently with respect to requiring proof of such sexual trauma.

Background
The bill is named after veteran Ruth Moore, a woman who was raped twice and then spent 23 years trying to get the benefits that were due to her.  Many military rapes go unreported, making it difficult for service members to get help later under the existing rules.

Provisions/Elements of the bill
This summary is based largely on the summary provided by the Congressional Research Service, a public domain source.

The Ruth Moore Act of 2013 would direct the United States Secretary of Veterans Affairs (VA), in any case in which a veteran claims that a covered mental health condition was incurred in or aggravated by military sexual trauma during active duty, to accept as sufficient proof of service-connection a diagnosis by a mental health professional together with satisfactory lay or other evidence of such trauma and an opinion by the mental health professional that such condition is related to such trauma, if consistent with the circumstances, conditions, or hardships of such service, notwithstanding the fact that there is no official record of such incurrence or aggravation in such service, and to resolve every reasonable doubt in favor of the veteran. The law would, however, allow such service-connection to be rebutted by clear and convincing evidence to the contrary.

The Ruth Moore Act of 2013 would include as a "covered mental health condition" post-traumatic stress disorder, anxiety, depression, or any other mental health diagnosis that the Secretary determines to be related to military sexual trauma.

Finally, if passed, the law would require the Secretary to report annually to Congress in each of 2014 through 2018 on covered claims submitted.

Procedural history

House
The Ruth Moore Act of 2013 was introduced in the House by Rep. Chellie Pingree (D-ME) on February 13, 2013.  It was referred to the United States House Committee on Veterans' Affairs and the United States House Veterans' Affairs Subcommittee on Disability Assistance and Memorial Affairs.  It passed the House on June 4, 2013 by a voice vote.

Debate and discussion

See also
List of bills in the 113th United States Congress
Sexual assault in the United States military
Military sexual trauma

Notes/References

External links

Library of Congress - Thomas H.R. 671
beta.congress.gov H.R. 671
GovTrack.us H.R. 671
OpenCongress.org H.R. 671
WashingtonWatch.com H.R. 671
Congressional Budget Office's Report on H.R. 671
House Republicans' Statements on H.R. 671
House Report 113-63 on H.R. 671

Proposed legislation of the 113th United States Congress
Post-traumatic stress disorder
Mental health in the United States
Military medicine in the United States
United States Department of Veterans Affairs